El Negreeto is the fourth studio album by Senegalese American singer, songwriter and record producer Akon, released on October 4, 2019, under his new independent record label Akonik Label Group, in association with BMG Rights Management. It is his first studio album in 11 years since Freedom (2008). The album serves as his first Spanish-language album and features a small amount of guest appearances from Farruko, Becky G, Anitta, and Pitbull, while the production was led by Akon himself, alongside a variety of producers such as Camilo Echeverry, Jimmy Joker, IAmChino, Mau y Ricky, Jon Leone and Maffio. All songs mixed by Matt Weiss, A&R Hiro "HirOshima" Oshima.

The album is one of the three part series of albums by Akon. His fifth album Akonda was released on October 25, and his upcoming sixth album Konnect will be released sometime in the future.

Background
Akon announced that he had founded his new independent record label Akonik Label Group, comprising four distinct labels: Akonda (Afrobeats), Akonik (United States), Ke Lo Ke (Latin America), and Jamakon (Caribbean) and that he was to release four albums later in the year. He started off by releasing a Latin album El Negreeto, an Afrobeats album Akonda, and a hip hop and R&B album Konnect. He will finish this off by releasing a collaborative album The Konnection, which will include guest artists such as Nicki Minaj, Pitbull and Ty Dolla Sign, among others.

El Negreeto was scheduled for release on August 31, 2019, but was delayed to October 4, 2019. The album's track listing was revealed by Billboard on October 2, 2019.

Singles
The album's first and only promotional single, "Get Money", featuring guest vocals from Puerto Rican rapper Anuel AA, was released on May 24, 2019. An accompanying music video was released on that same date, and has garnered 11.5 million views as of May 2020.

The album's lead single, "Cómo No", featuring guest vocals from Mexican-American singer Becky G, was released on September 6, 2019, with an accompanying music video being broadcast in Time Square. The music video has since garnered over 45 million views as of May 2020. They performed the song live for the first time at the 2019 MTV Europe Music Awards.

The album's second single, "Te Quiero Amar" featuring Cuban-American rapper Pitbull, was released on April 2, 2020. An accompanying music video was released that same date, and has garnered over 10.5 million views as of May 2020. A radio version of the single with different vocals from Akon was sent to radios on that same date as well.

The album's third single, "Sólo Tú" featuring Puerto Rican singer Farruko, was released on June 17, 2020, with an accompanying music video with over 8.8 million views as of August 2020, the music video switches Akon's and Farruko's verses from the original audio.

Track listing
Credits adopted from Tidal.

Charts

References

2019 albums
Akon albums
Spanish-language albums
Latin music albums by American artists
BMG Rights Management albums